The Johor Bahru Central Business District or currently known as Ibrahim International Business District, is the commercial and political centre for the city of Johor Bahru in Johor, Malaysia.

JBCBD is officially defined as the area within the Johor Bahru Inner Ring Road comprising the city centre, Jalan Wong Ah Fook, Royal Johor Museum, the palace grounds, Sultanah Aminah Hospital and Southern Integrated Gateway.

Centre for business 
The area is a centre of business activity.  All of the country's major banks have a presence in the city centre.  Major shopping centres such as Johor Bahru City Square and Komtar JBCC are located within the area.

Centre for politics and government 
The area is also the seat of the state branches of the federal government as well as political parties' offices.

Transport hub 
The area also plays host to the custom, immigration and quarantine (CIQ) complex of the Malaysian Government on the Malaysia-Singapore Causeway, including Sultan Iskandar Building.

The Johor Bahru Sentral railway station is also located in the area. Johor Bahru–Singapore Rapid Transit System and Iskandar Malaysia Bus Rapid Transit will be the future public transport model located in the CBD.

References

External links 

 Johor Bahru Hunts

Johor Bahru
Central business districts